Motspur Park, also known locally as West Barnes, is a residential suburb in south-west London, in the New Malden district. It straddles the boroughs of Kingston upon Thames and Merton.

Motspur Park owes its identity to the railway station of the same name, opened in 1925, which has six trains an hour to London Waterloo, and to the adjacent parade of small shops. Three prominent gas holders, which were used to store the consumer gas supply for south-west London, stand just south of the shopping parade and can be seen from a wide area.

Two of London's minor natural watercourses flow through Motspur Park: Beverley Brook runs south to north through the centre and its tributary the Pyl Brook runs parallel to the east in shallow depressions in the land.

The Motspur Park athletics stadium was built by the University of London in 1928 and achieved fame when the world mile record was set there in 1938. It was sold to Fulham Football Club as their training ground in 1999.

Name
The Mot family owned land in this area in the 14th century and gave their name to a farm that lay west of the Beverley Brook. In 1627, the farm was called Motes Firs . 'Firs' being a reference to the furze or gorse that grew nearby. It had changed to  Motts Spur Farm by 1823. The 1865 OS map uses a contemporary variant, Mospur.

This lay between the later constructed roads of Motspur Park and Chilmark Gardens.

"Park" was an appendage added in the late nineteenth century, to mirror Worcester Park,  Raynes Park and Stoneleigh Park, forming a contiguous belt of "Park" districts. Market gardening in intensive cultivation systems was the main form of agriculture of local land in these areas at the time and this intense cultivation was sometimes called a park.   But the  "Park" addition  was deliberately promoted to suggest the area was a conversion from a landscaped garden or a wider inclosure. The word 'park' was further adopted by local government, railway operators, and house builders in promotional literature to attract capital-rich or high income residents into these new outer commuter suburbs.

History

Rural origins
The district was historically known as West Barnes and formed part of the traditional county of Surrey. It was rural up to the end of the nineteenth century due to its lack of a railway station . Two roads hark back to this rural time,  West Barnes Lane and Blakes Lane and are marked on the oldest maps. The barns referred to were those at the western end of Merton Abbey's estates and were just north of West Barnes Lane's junction with the modern Crossway.

After the dissolution of the monasteries the abbey land was granted to the Gresham family, (descendants of Thomas Gresham) who were wealthy London merchants. They retained the estate for two generations, selling it in 1570 – a date questioned – or 1612 to John Carpenter, a local farmer. The area remained agricultural, with farms owned or farmed out to smaller tenant farmers by wealthy families. Senior owners were notably the Raynes family who gave their name to Raynes Park. In the nineteenth century two major landowners were Charles Blake of Blue House Farm (area of the modern Barnes End) and Richard Garth Lord of the Manor of Morden. Both were lawyers and Garth eventually became a judge. They joined forces to agree to a bill for a railway line to Leatherhead and beyond to run across their land in order to receive valuable compensation and in a calculated long-term view to  enhance future land value.

The railway's earthworks were planned and dug (largely laying a slight embankment, assisting with bridges over roads) and then laid through the locality in 1859 by the London and South Western Railway. The local station opened much later in 1925, the station name rapidly become the popular name of the district.

The 1871 map shows small farm workers cottages adjunct to farmhouses and a few mansions as the only dwellings of the area. The area east of the railway was part of Hobbald(e)s Farm owned by Garth. The mature oak woodland alongside it was planted around this time as screening; today is a nature reserve.

The land was sold and eventually leased to J.J. Bishop (founder of the Bishops Move removal company) around 1873. In 1892 a tranche of land was sold to the Battersea Corporation for use as a cemetery; today the Northeast Surrey Crematorium.

Beginning of the suburban era
The area developed as a proto-suburb before World War I and fully in the Inter-War Period. First developments were streets off Burlington Road which had a tram route from about 1906: the northern ends of Belmont, Cavendish and Claremont Avenues in the west; and Seaforth, Estela and Adela Avenues in the east. Mostly with short well-serviced terraces, typically six houses joined, each with three bedrooms and a bathroom upstairs and two living rooms and a kitchen downstairs. Motspur Park attracted its first characteristic playing fields at this time.

The country's first dual carriageway of the type purpose-built across green fields, the Kingston Bypass (A3), was opened in 1926. It became the de facto north-western boundary. The large local junction at Shannon Corner, had a large, tall concrete Odeon cinema. The road brought speculative house building on open land from this point to Chessington, stimulating residential development of any remaining little-used fields and sites.

The principal developer who turned Motspur Park into a residential suburb between the world wars was Sidney Ernest Parkes a boat manufacturer and constructional engineer.  His company, Modern Homes and Estates Ltd, was founded in 1924 and was responsible for many of the streets its streets including Phyllis Avenue and Arthur Road, named after his children; Byron Avenue, Tennyson Avenue and Marina Avenue. Wates were also active builders in the area in the inter war years, building to the west of the railway line.

The only local public house, The Earl Beatty, celebrates David Beatty, 1st Earl Beatty who commanded a large part of the British fleet at the Battle of Jutland in the First World War.

In 1931 part of Hobbald(e)s Farm was acquired by Merton and Morden Urban District to become the Sir Joseph Hood Memorial Playing Fields. One reason was to perpetuate the name of local benefactor and ex-Mayor of Wimbledon, Sir Joseph Hood. Its contents: a large pavilion, football and cricket pitches, tennis courts, bowling green, putting green and children's play areas. Part is now a managed local nature reserve.

The biggest local employer in the twentieth century was the Decca gramophone record company. In 1929 this was making up to 60,000 records a day at its factory in Burlington Road, New Malden. The company diversified during World War II to make radar and the Decca Navigator System.

The Shannon typewriter company manufactured at Shannon Corner to which it gave its name. Nearby were  the Venner timeswitch company maker of Britain's first parking meters and Carter's Tested Seeds.  Bradbury Wilkinson, a security printing company, designers and makers of banknotes for small country clients, is today the site of  Tesco hypermarket.

The Motspur Park athletics stadium was built by the University of London in 1928. Sydney Charles Wooderson set the then world mile record of 4min 6.4sec at the sports ground on 28 August 1938. The stadium and ground are now owned by Fulham football club as their training camp.

The Church of England built Holy Cross Church where the first service was held in 1908. Following its destruction during the Second World War a new building was erected on the site – the first church, replacement or new, completed after the war in the Diocese. Designed by architect Ralph Covell it was dedicated for worship in 1949. (The church hall burned down in the 1980s and has since been rebuilt.) The parish broke away from its parent Morden, taking a little of New Malden (itself a portion of early medieval Malden) in 1978.

In 1906 a Mr and Mrs Howlett moved into 138 Seaforth Avenue. They started a Sunday School in their house. Soon adults also began to attend and the house was outgrown. The product was in 1925 West Barnes Gospel Hall in Seaforth Avenue, which later became the home of New Malden Evangelical Free Church, was opened.

World War II
The University of London and BBC recreation club grounds were sites of anti-aircraft batteries. The BBC site was the home guard base. Around 30 high explosive bombs fell across the district between October 1940 and June 1941. A large community bomb shelter was built near the entrance to the Joseph Hood Playing Fields. In one incident a stick of bombs was aimed at the railway station by a German bomber but missed and destroyed houses in Marina Avenue (including the six from 63 to 73) and Claremont Avenue (166–168, and possibly 162–164, Claremont Avenue). The bomb landing in Claremont Avenue landed on a 21st birthday house party killing many.  In other events a bailed-out German pilot landed on top of the gasometers but fell to his death.

On the morning of 3 July 1944, a V1 flying bomb came down close to 45 Motspur Park; seven houses were razed and no deaths reported. Several other houses close by were badly damaged. The bomb sites became "a playground" for young children in the area for a few years, pending rebuilding .

Post-war 

Post-war affluence saw many houses extended, often with loft conversions and conservatories. By the 1980s most front gardens had been paved or gravelled for car parking, reflecting the rise in car ownership . The very few large Victorian houses have been mostly subdivided or demolished for new building.

An earlier small B&Q store-warehouse stood next to West Barnes Library on the site of the Victorian Ivy House, now replaced by Blossom House School.  It has now  relocated to Burlington Retail Park, west of the area.

From the late 1950s to mid-1980s a petrol station with repair garage adjoined the level crossing, known as Jackson's Garage. , the site now Fulham Football Club's main office.

An ironmongers once occupied today's garage door store. A small retail dairy/farm store selling milk, butter and eggs at first occupied the private tuition centre's unit. The parade once had three butchers, an RACS Co-op grocery store, a shoe repair shop, and a Coombes bakers . The modern three-unit supermarket 'Ecklee' began as smaller 'Ghassans' in 1988. The original library, before its removal to its present site by the station, occupied a shop on the corner of Station Road. It is now  a barber shop.  The Midipharmacy began as Mr Griffiths chemist at the parade's 1930s origins.  A few clothes outlets have ventured here, such as 1980s short-lived 'Get Clobbered'. Three newsagents/sweetshops/toyshops competed in the 1950s to 1970s – A.R. Waylett, Bromheads and one surviving today, enlarged, 'Sweet Things and Things'. A fishmonger preceded the kebab outlet, close to the Lebanese grill. Major banks were in the parade in their mid-to-late 20th century branches' surge: Lloyds' and Midland Bank.

Famous residents
 Nigel Winterburn, football player
 George Clinton, musician
Caitlin Thomas, author and the widow of Welsh poet Dylan Thomas lived for a while in Arthur Road during the 70s.

Fictional media and popular culture references
Motspur Park's suburban archetypal townscape but relative obscurity means it has been used as settings in sketches for BBC comedy series notably Brush Strokes,  a television comedy series about an amorous painter and decorator, which ran for five series between 1986 and 1991.

Playing fields
Green belt planning restriction has allowed these fields to remain despite pressure from developers. The playing fields located within the Motspur Park area are:

The King's College School Kingsway sports ground
The Sir Joseph Hood Memorial Playing Fields, home of Motspur Park football club
Dornan Fields, home of KCS Old Boys rugby club
The Old Blues rugby club Dornan Fields, Arthur Road
The Tenison's School playing field Arthur road (purchased in 1924)
Plus one other minor ground

Former University of London athletics ground (now Fulham football club training ground) 
The University of London Athletics ground was laid out in 1931, the University having spent £18,000 in 1926 to acquire what was then unspoilt countryside and almost as much again on levelling and drainage works to help establish Motspur Park as a top-class facility. The 28-acre site was opened by the university's chancellor, Lord Beauchamp William Lygon, 7th Earl Beauchamp. A pavilion and covered stand followed in 1932, and in May of that year the ground hosted the Inter-Universities sport event. It was allowed to be used as the venue for the annual ‘Laundry Sports’, staged for the capital's laundry workers during the 1930s.

The athletics track was, until the 1970s, arguably the finest in London, graced by the likes of Sydney Wooderson, who set a world record for the mile on it in 1937, and Roger Bannister winning the 1 Mile in the Inter-Hospitals Athletic Championships in 1952.

As an athletics track it served for scenes in films The Games (1970), Chariots of Fire (1981) and The Four Minute Mile (1988) (TV).

In 1996, the athletics track was grassed over. Three years later in 1999, the ground was sold to Fulham F.C. as the club's permanent training ground. It has since been extensively updated into a state-of-the-art sporting facility with over 150 members of staff.

Former BBC sports ground 
The BBC Club had been introduced by John Reith, 1st Baron Reith General Manager & Director-General of the BBC in 1924 and expanded in 1929 with the development of a purpose built and extensive 21-acre sports ground at Motspur Park. By June 1930, 400 of the 600 Head Office staff were club members.

The clubhouse was built in 1929 as a colonial style pavilion complete with clock tower. The grounds were laid out with the help of Bert Lock an English cricketer and prominent groundsman, included four football pitches, six tennis courts, one hockey pitch, one rugby pitch, two cricket squares, and a rifle range. The BBC moved from its original home at Savoy Hill off the Strand to purpose built premises at Broadcasting House in Langham Place in 1932. The ground also hosted a Model Railway Club, a 5-inch live steam track used to run parallel to the railway line opposite to the location of the gas towers. It was later relocated behind tennis courts. The BBC would host annual summer events, and bonfire and fireworks party early November.

In 1948, the Cambridge university athlete John Mark (athlete) was chosen to carry the Olympic Torch the final leg of its journey into Wembley Stadium and lit the flame in its specially designed bowl. He did his initial training for this event in strict secrecy at the BBC sports ground in Motspur Park.

In later days it occasionally featured in BBC comedy series such as Monty Python's Flying Circus (1969-1974) and The Two Ronnies (1971-1987). The grounds and buildings were sold by the BBC in July 2000, to Hawkesbrook Leisure Group, who took a lease to run Motspur Park as a commercial venture, which included providing services to the BBC Club, but the company ran into financial difficulties. In July 2004, the club closed, with the loss of all facilities to Club members. In 2005, it was purchased by Irishman Ben Dunne (entrepreneur) for £3 million. However a series of planning disputes left it derelict for many years, until a devastating Clubhouse fire in July 2016.

The extensive grounds were obtained by Fulham F.C in 2018 as a satellite training ground.

Education

Nearby places
To the west:
Kingston upon Thames, Old Malden
To the south:
Worcester Park, North Cheam 
To the east:
Morden, Merton, Wimbledon 
To the north:
New Malden, Raynes Park

Gallery

See also
Motspur Park railway station

Bibliography
 Jowett, Evelyn M.  An Illustrated History of Merton and Morden Published Merton and Mordon Festival of Britain Local Committee (1951)

References

External links

 Sir Joseph Hood Memorial Playing Fields  A report for London Borough of Merton December 2006.  Written by Alan Scott BSc. MSc. MIEEM. CEnv. Contains a study of the local wildlife and a local history.
 Raynes Park and West Barnes Residents' Association Links to many resources on local history.
 Potted History of New Malden Evangelical Free Church. Retrieved August 2007.
 MotspurPark.info, a community website launched in May 2010 with What's On, news and features for the area
 Friends of Sir Joseph Hood Memorial Playing Field
 Motspur Park blog

Areas of London
Districts of the Royal Borough of Kingston upon Thames
Districts of the London Borough of Merton